Dashtiari County is in Sistan and Baluchestan province, Iran. The capital of the county is the city of Negur. At the 2006 census, the region's population (as Dashtiari District of Chabahar County) was 57,813 in 11,196 households. The following census in 2011 counted 72,743 people in 15,022 households. At the 2016 census, the district's population was 79,911 in 18,079 households. The district was separated from the county in 2018 to become Dashtiari County.

Administrative divisions

The population history of Dashtiari County's administrative divisions (as Dashtiari District of Chabahar County) over three consecutive censuses is shown in the following table.

References

 

Counties of Sistan and Baluchestan Province